The Hong Kong Women League is a Hong Kong football league for women's association football clubs. It was originally established in 1986 by the Hong Kong Ladies Football Association, but was re-formed and is now organised by the Hong Kong Football Association. It does not affiliate to any women football leagues in the rest of China.

History
Established in 1986 by the Hong Kong Ladies Football Association, the first season was competed by 6 teams, with Caroline Hill Women winning the title. However, since the association is not well-structured, the league was organised badly.

In 2009, after Hong Kong won the gold medal in the 2009 East Asian Games, the Hong Kong government announced and introduced the Project Phoenix which suggested that the Hong Kong Football Association should introduce a new and structured women league.

In 2012, the HKFA introduced the new Hong Kong Women League with 10 teams competing for the league title.

In 2018, the HKFA introduced the two-tier system for the Hong Kong Women League, with 8 teams competing in the First Division and 6–7 teams competing in the Second Division.

Competition format
There are 8 clubs in the First Division. Each club plays other clubs twice for a total of 14 games. Teams receive three points for a win and one point for a draw. No points are awarded for a loss. Teams are ranked by total points, then goal difference, and then goals scored. At the end of each season, the club with the most points is crowned champion. If points are equal, the goal difference and then goals scored determine the winner.

Each match lasts for 90 minutes, with 45 minutes halves. Each club is allowed to name 3 foreign players on the pitch and to make at most 5 substitutions in a game. However, Hong Kong FC are the only team which can name more than 3 foreign players on the pitch as they are formed by foreign people.

The above rules remain the same in the Second Division.

Competing clubs

2012–13 season
The following 10 clubs are competing in the Hong Kong Women League during the 2012–13 season.

Champions
2012–13: Citizen
2013–14: Citizen
2014–15: Citizen
2015–16: Citizen
2016–17: Citizen
2017–18: Kitchee
2018–19: Happy Valley (First Division), Standard Perpetual MLFA (Second Division)

See also
 AFC Women's Club Championship

References

External links
 Hong Kong FA

Hong Kong
Women's football in Hong Kong
Women
Women's sports leagues in Hong Kong
Sports leagues established in 1986
1986 establishments in Hong Kong